The First Kiss (German: Der erste Kuß) is a 1954 Austrian-West German comedy film directed by Erik Ode and starring Isa Günther, Jutta Günther and Erich Auer. It was shot at the Salzburg Studios and on location around the city and the nearby area. The film's sets were designed by the art director Gustav Abel.

Synopsis
Two twin sisters living in Salzburg encounter Paul, an aviator from Munich, and each enjoys what they think is a mild flirtation with him while pretending to be the other one. Paul is really in love with his fiancée back in Munich with whom he has quarrelled.

Cast
 Isa Günther as Helga
 Jutta Günther as Gretel
 Erich Auer as Paul Merleth
 Hans Nielsen as Escher
 Adrienne Gessner as Omi
 Hanna Rucker as Ilse Dirks
 Rudolf Vogel as Mons. Oberbitzler
 Margaret Cargill as Inge Böhm
 Gisela Urbain as Lilli 
 Alexander von Richthofen as Walter Beck
 Peter Vogel as Mathias Dammerl			
 Johannes von Hamme as Ilses Vater

References

Bibliography 
 Fritsche, Maria. Homemade Men in Postwar Austrian Cinema: Nationhood, Genre and Masculinity. Berghahn Books, 2013.

External links 
 

1954 films
1954 comedy films
Austrian comedy films
German comedy films
West German films
1950s German-language films
Films directed by Erik Ode
1950s German films
Films shot in Austria
Films set in Salzburg

de:Der erste Kuß (1954)